Stuart Barrett Worden (May 6, 1907 – March 17, 1978) was an American football player. He played college football for Hampden-Sydney and in the National Football League (NFL) as a guard, tackle, and center for the Brooklyn Dodgers during the 1930, 1932, 1933, and 1934 seasons. He appeared in 44 NFL games, 35 as a starter.

References

1907 births
1978 deaths
Brooklyn Dodgers (NFL) players
Players of American football from Virginia